Teenage Caveman is a 2002 science fiction-horror-teen film directed by controversial filmmaker Larry Clark. It was made as part of a series of low-budget made-for-television movies loosely inspired by B movies that Samuel Z. Arkoff had produced for AIP. The film reused the title and basic premise from the original 1958 film Teenage Caveman, but it is not a remake of the earlier film.

Plot
The film is set in a post-apocalyptic future, where the vast majority of humanity has died due to a viral epidemic. The remaining humans have reverted to primitive tribalism.

After killing his father for sexually assaulting his girlfriend, the son of a tribal leader is banished from the tribe, along with his friends. They eventually stumble upon a solar-powered city whose only two inhabitants are genetically modified to survive the plague. They view themselves as superhuman mutants who intend to recreate humanity in their own image.

Cast
Andrew Keegan as David
Tara Subkoff as Sarah
Richard Hillman as Neil
Tiffany Limos as Judith
Stephen Jasso as Vincent
Crystal Celeste Grant as Elizabeth
Shan Elliot as Joshua
Hayley Keenan as Heather
Paul Hipp as Shaman

Reception
The film received very mixed reviews from critics.

Scott Thill of PopMatters suggested to "grab some popcorn" and "kick back and laugh".

Kim Newman of Empire gave the film a score of 3 out of 5 stars.

When the DVD version of Teenage Caveman was released on June 10, 2016, Bill Chambers of Film Freak Central wrote: "Unfortunately, while [the film] is a testament to Clark's auteurist position, it establishes him as a filmmaker of limited range".

References

External links

2002 television films
2002 films
2000s science fiction horror films
2000s teen horror films
Films directed by Larry Clark
Patricide in fiction
American post-apocalyptic films
Remakes of American films
Films about sexually transmitted diseases
American monster movies
American science fiction horror films
Horror film remakes
American teen horror films
Juvenile sexuality in films
American body horror films
American science fiction television films
2000s American films